SILF may refer to:
Société internationale de linguistique fonctionnelle, a linguistics organisation
Syrian Islamic Liberation Front, a former coalition of Islamist rebel brigades